Moulay Ahmed Alaoui (1919–2002) was a Moroccan politician and the cousin of Hassan II.

He served as the Minister of Tourism from 1960 to 1961 and the Minister of State from 1981 to 1998.

Biography 

Moulay Ahmed Alaoui has served as a minister on several occasions. Between 1960 and 1961, he served as the Minister of Tourism in Morocco under the government of Mohammed V. Between 1981 and 1998, he served as the Minister of State in Morocco under several governments, including the government of Abdellatif Filali.

Moulay Ahmad Alaoui is a member of the Alaouite dynasty and is a freemason.

References 

1919 births
2002 deaths
Government ministers of Morocco
Moroccan civil servants
Moroccan politicians